Five Nights at Freddy's 2 is a survival horror video game developed and published by Scott Cawthon. It is the second installment in the Five Nights at Freddy's series, and a prequel to the first game. Like its predecessor, the game takes place in a fictional pizzeria where the player acts as a security guard who must defend themselves from hostile animatronic characters that roam the place at night.

Cawthon first teased the game in September 2014, just one month after the release of the first game. It was released on Steam on November 10, 2014, earlier than its planned release date of December 25, 2014. Mobile ports of the game were released for Android and iOS were released on November 12, 2014, and November 20, 2014, respectively, and ports for Nintendo Switch, PlayStation 4 and Xbox One were released on November 29, 2019.

The game received mostly positive reviews from critics, who praised its panic-inducing gameplay but criticized its difficulty in comparison to its predecessor. The third game in the series, Five Nights at Freddy's 3, was released on March 2, 2015.

Gameplay

Similar to the first game, Five Nights at Freddy's 2 is a survival horror video game with point-and-click elements. Players take on the role of a security guard who must survive the night shift at a fictional pizza restaurant without being attacked by the animatronic characters that wander through the building. The animatronics include remodeled versions of Freddy, Bonnie, Chica and Foxy from the first game, as well as their old, decrepit counterparts. Two completely new characters are also featured, including a puppet-like character called the Marionette (or simply The Puppet), and a humanoid animatronic called Balloon Boy.

As in the first game, the player sits alone in an office. They cannot leave, but can track the animatronics' movements via a network of security cameras placed throughout the building. The office has three entrances, a hallway and two side air vents, through which animatronics can enter. Unlike the previous game, none of these can be sealed off, but can be checked by lights.

The player can avoid attack by most characters using a wearable animatronic mask; however, this strategy will not work on Foxy nor the Marionette, who are repelled by other means. A flashlight must be repeatedly shone into the hallway to ward off Foxy, and the Marionette is subdued by a music box that must be kept wound up by the player using a button on a camera feed. Unlike the first game, the power supply for camera and light use is unlimited, but this does not apply to the flashlight; if its battery runs out, the player becomes vulnerable to attack. The player will be jumpscared if they fail to defend themselves from any animatronic except for Balloon Boy, who will instead appear in the player's office and disable their flashlight.

After the player is jumpscared, there is a chance that, rather than the usual game over screen, an Atari-style minigame will appear, in which the player controls one of the animatronic characters. The minigames provide insight into the game's plot.

The game consists of five main levels referred to as "nights", gradually increasing in difficulty. Completing all five main nights unlocks an even more difficult sixth night, which in turn unlocks a seventh "custom night" upon completion. In this night, the player can adjust the difficulty of each individual animatronic, or play one of ten pre-set challenges.

Plot

The player assumes the role of Jeremy Fitzgerald, a security guard at a new Freddy Fazbear's Pizza location. An employee nicknamed "Phone Guy" calls Jeremy on the office phone each night to provide advice and information about the franchise's backstory. Phone Guy explains that the restaurant's animatronics feature facial recognition software connected to a criminal database, with the purpose of protecting children from potential harm. Despite these features, the robots were not programmed with a proper night mode; when they detect silence, they seek out the nearest source of noise to find people to entertain, which happens to be Jeremy's office. The voice from the phone also explains that a number of 'older' animatronics are kept onsite for spare parts.

As the game progresses, the Phone Guy rumors surrounding the restaurant, and later reveals it to be the subject of a police investigation. Atari-styled minigames provide insight into the restaurant's troubled past, implying that it was the site of the murder of multiple children by a nameless individual represented by a purple figure. On the game's fifth night, Jeremy is informed by Phone Guy that the restaurant has been put on lockdown due to an unspecified event, to make sure no employees, present or former, can enter or leave. He also mentions that the restaurant's daytime security has a vacancy, and Jeremy may be promoted to it. Jeremy receives a check at the end of the fifth night, dated November 1987, revealing that the game is a prequel to the first installment.

On the sixth night, the voice on the phone informs Jeremy that the restaurant has been shut down for undisclosed reasons, albeit mentioning someone's use of a "spare yellow suit" and malfunction of the restaurant's animatronics. The voice mentions that he plans to take over for Jeremy as the restaurant's nighttime security guard when it reopens, and that Jeremy will work a daytime shift for a birthday party the following day. A newspaper is shown upon the night’s completion that announces the restaurant's closure, stating that the new redesigned animatronics will be scrapped, but their older counterparts will be saved for when the restaurant reopens, leading to the events of the first game.

On the seventh "custom night", the player acts as a new character named Fritz Smith. Upon completing this night, Fritz is fired for tampering with the animatronics and odor.

Development and release
Shortly after the release of Five Nights at Freddy's, developer Cawthon began to confirm rumors of a sequel to the game. Just one month after the original game's release, Cawthon posted a teaser of a sequel on his webpage, and continued to post teasers until the game's release. A trailer for the game was released in October 2014, and a special demo was given to certain YouTubers such as Markiplier.

The game was released for Microsoft Windows on November 11, 2014, earlier than its planned release of December 25, 2014, due to issues with releasing the demo. Ports for Android and iOS were released on November 12 and 20 of the same year, and Nintendo Switch, PlayStation 4 and Xbox One ports were released on November 29, 2019.

Reception 

Five Nights at Freddy's 2 received "mixed or average" reviews according to review aggregator Metacritic, assigning the Windows version a score of 62 out of 100. Omri Petitte for PC Gamer gave the game a score of 70 out of 100, calling it "a horror game dipping heavily into deception and subtlety, a wonderfully cruel cocktail of supernatural mystery and jolts of panicked adrenaline", while disapproving of its “frustratingly steep difficulty."

Destructoid gave a positive review, opining that "it's absolutely terrifying to know that you could be attacked at any moment from multiple avenues", praising the introduction of new animatronics and mechanics, but criticizing the jumpscares and calling the game "too hard for its own good". TouchArcade opined that the game was better than its predecessor in "almost every respect", though noting the game's difficulty "might turn some away". In a review for the Nintendo Switch version of the game in 2019, Mitch Vogel of Nintendo Life said, "Five Nights at Freddy's 2 may not necessarily reinvent the wheel, but it still does a fine job of keeping you on the edge of your seat."

References

External links

 
 Five Nights at Freddy's 2 on IndieDB

2014 video games
Android (operating system) games
2
Indie video games
IOS games
Point-and-click adventure games
PlayStation 4 games
Single-player video games
Video game prequels
Video games about robots
Video games set in 1987
Video games developed in the United States
Windows games
Works about missing people
Nintendo Switch games
Clickteam Fusion games
Xbox Cloud Gaming games
Xbox One games
2010s horror video games